Loranth, in biology, can refer to a plant of the genus 

 Loranthus, or of the family which subsumes it, the
 Loranthaceae.

Also,

 Loranth (Lóránth) is a Hungarian surname.